Peter Aubry (born May 19, 1977) is a former Canadian professional ice hockey goaltender and current interim assistant coach of the American Hockey League's Rockford IceHogs.

Born in Windsor, Ontario, Aubry spent four years in Mercyhurst College before turning pro in 2002, signing for the Johnstown Chiefs of the ECHL and also played three games for the American Hockey League's Saint John Flames.  He had single season spells over the next two years in the United Hockey League for the Elmira Jackals and back in the ECHL with the Alaska Aces before moving to Great Britain in 2005, signing for the Cardiff Devils as their starting goalie.  In 2006, Aubry signed with the Essen Mosquitoes of the 2nd Eishockey-Bundesliga before moving back to the UK, signing for the Newcastle Vipers.  Aubry split 2007-08 in the ECHL with the Texas Wildcatters and back in the 2nd Bundesliga with EV Landsberg before returning to the Cardiff Devils in 2008.  Aubry signed with Ducs d'Angers in France for the 2009-10 season.

Aubry is currently a developmental goaltending coach for the Chicago Blackhawks, and was named interim assistant coach of the Rockford IceHogs on November 6, 2021.

Awards and honours

External links

1977 births
Alaska Aces (ECHL) players
Canadian ice hockey goaltenders
Cardiff Devils players
Chicago Blackhawks coaches
Ducs d'Angers players
Elmira Jackals (UHL) players
Essen Mosquitoes players
EV Landsberg players
Ice hockey people from Ontario
Johnstown Chiefs players
Living people
Mercyhurst Lakers men's ice hockey players
Newcastle Vipers players
Saint John Flames players
Sportspeople from Windsor, Ontario
Texas Wildcatters players
Canadian expatriate ice hockey players in England
Canadian expatriate ice hockey players in Wales
Canadian expatriate ice hockey players in France
Canadian expatriate ice hockey players in Germany
Canadian expatriate ice hockey players in the United States
Canadian ice hockey coaches
Chicago Blackhawks personnel